The Lydian barbel (Luciobarbus lydianus) is a species of ray-finned fish in the genus Luciobarbus from the Gediz River and Asagiçavuslu Stream in Turkey.

References 

 

lydianus
Endemic fauna of Turkey
Fish described in 1896